Craig Neidorf (born 1969),  Knight Lightning, was one of the two founding editors of Phrack Magazine, an online, text-based ezine that defined the hacker mentality of the mid 1980s.

Craig, along with Phrack co-founder Randy Tischler (aka Taran King), came up with the concept of Phrack and published it from 1985 onwards. The Phrack newsletters were recognized for providing very informative updates of the national scene considering their oblique sources and served as a bible to the hackers of the day.

In 1990, Neidorf was facing 31 years in jail after being arrested and charged with receiving a document stolen from BellSouth, and with publicly distributing it online. BellSouth described the document, on the subject of the inner workings of the Enhanced 911 system, as being worth US$79,449 (a figure which included, among other things, the value of the VAX workstation on which the document had been typed). The charges were dropped when it was revealed that the document was not, as initially described, source code, but rather a memorandum, and that more detailed documents could be ordered from BellSouth for $13. The proceedings are formally known as United States v. Riggs.

The case was a catalyst in the founding of the Electronic Frontier Foundation.

References

External links
Transcript of the opening statements at Neidorf's trial

1969 births
Living people